Mycolicibacillus parakoreensis (formerly Mycobacterium parakoreense) is a slow-growing, non-chromogenic species of Mycolicibacillus originally isolated from the sputum of a human patient. It is susceptible to amikacin, clarithromycin, and rifampin.

References

Acid-fast bacilli
parakoreensis
Bacteria described in 2013